Jane Taylor (23 September 178313 April 1824) was an English poet and novelist best known for the lyrics of the widely known "Twinkle, Twinkle, Little Star". The sisters Jane and Ann Taylor and their authorship of various works have often been confused, partly because their early ones were published together. Ann Taylor's son, Josiah Gilbert, wrote in her biography, "Two little poems – 'My Mother,' and 'Twinkle, twinkle, little Star' – are perhaps more frequently quoted than any; the first, a lyric of life, was by Ann, the second, of nature, by Jane; and they illustrate this difference between the sisters."

Biography

Early life
Born in London, Jane Taylor lived with her family at Shilling Grange in Shilling Street, Lavenham, Suffolk, where her house can still be seen. Her mother was the writer Ann Taylor. In 1796–1810, she lived in Colchester. "Twinkle, Twinkle, Little Star" was written in New House, Ongar, as confirmed by descendants of the Taylor family. The Taylor sisters belonged to an extensive literary family. Their father, Isaac Taylor of Ongar, was an engraver and later a dissenting minister. Their mother, Ann Taylor (née Martin) (1757–1830), wrote seven works of moral and religious advice, two of which were fictionalized.

Literary career

The collection Original Poems for Infant Minds by several young persons was solicited by the publisher Darton and Harvey and published anonymously. The main contributors were Ann Taylor, Jane Taylor, and Adelaide O'Keeffe, but Bernard Barton and various other members of the Taylor family contributed to it as well. As Donelle Ruwe writes in her study of its genesis and reception history, it was issued as a single-volume work in 1804. When it proved successful, further poems were solicited for an additional volume, which was published in 1805. Over time, the collection became associated with the Taylor family. Although O'Keeffe wrote to the publisher requesting a greater percentage of the collection's proceeds, Darton and Harvey deferred to the Taylor family regarding all editorial decisions. For their part, the Taylor family was openly hostile to O'Keeffe and dismissive of her background in writing for the stage. (O'Keeffe's father was the popular Irish playwright John O'Keeffe.)

After the success of Original Poems for Infant Minds, Ann and Jane Taylor published the poetry collections Rhymes for the Nursery in 1806 and Hymns for Infant Minds in 1810. In the two volumes of Original Poems for Infant Minds, the Taylor sisters, O'Keeffe, and the other contributors were identified as authors for each poem by initial or other identifying markers. In Rhymes for the Nursery (1806), Ann and Jane Taylor were not identified as the collection's authors or individual poems. The most famous piece in the 1806 collection is "The Star," commonly known today as "Twinkle, Twinkle, Little Star", which was set to a French tune.

Christina Duff Stewart identifies authorship in Rhymes for the Nursery based on a copy belonging to Canon Isaac Taylor, who noted the pieces by Ann and Jane Taylor. Canon Isaac was Taylor's nephew, a son of her brother Isaac Taylor of Stanford Rivers. Stewart also confirms attributions of Original Poems based on the publisher's records.

Jane Taylor also wrote the popular moral verse, The Violet, which begins:
Down in a green and shady bed,
A modest violet grew;
Its stalk was bent, it hung its head
As if to hide from view.
And yet it was a lovely flower,
Its colour bright and fair;
It might have graced a rosy bower,
Instead of hiding there.

Taylor's novel Display (1814), reminiscent of Maria Edgeworth or perhaps even Jane Austen, went through at least 13 editions up to 1832. Her Essays in Rhyme appeared in 1816, and contained some significant poetry. In the fictional Correspondence between a Mother and Her Daughter at School (1817), Taylor collaborated with her mother. The Family Mansion. A Tale appeared in 1819, and Practical Hints to Young Females some time before 1822.

Jane Taylor accepted the editorship of the religious Youth's Magazine. She wrote numerous shorter pieces for the magazine, including moral tales and personal essays, and these were collected in The Contributions of Q. Q.  Throughout her life, Taylor wrote many essays, plays, stories, poems, and letters which were never published. She was also erroneously named as author of works such as The Authoress (1819), Prudence and Principle (1818), and Rachel: A Tale (1817).

Death
Jane Taylor died on 13 April 1824 of breast cancer at the age of 40, her mind still "teeming with unfulfilled projects". She was buried at Ongar churchyard in Essex. After her death, her brother Isaac collected many of her works and included a biography of her in The Writings of Jane Taylor, In Five Volumes (1832).

Popular influence
Taylor's most famous verse, "Twinkle, Twinkle, Little Star", is almost always uncredited. "Its opening stanza persists as if it were folklore, the name of its creator almost entirely forgotten." Alternative versions, pastiches and parodies abounded. See main article.
The best-known parody of "Twinkle, Twinkle, Little Star" is a poem recited by the Mad Hatter in Lewis Carroll's Alice's Adventures in Wonderland (1865).
Jane Taylor is credited by Robert Browning in an introductory note to a late poem, "Rephan", which he states was "suggested by a very early recollection of a prose story" by her.

Notes

References
Paula R. Feldman, (1997) British Women Poets of the Romantic Era: An Anthology, Baltimore & London: Johns Hopkins University Press
Donelle Ruwe, (2014) British Children's Poetry in the Romantic Era: Verse, Riddle, and Rhyme, Houndsmills: Palgrave Macmillan
Donelle Ruwe, (2007) "[Jane Taylor]'s The Authoress: Aesthetics, Pedagogy, and a Parody of the Amateur Lady Author", ANQ: A Quarterly Journal of Short Articles, Notes, and Reviews 20.4 (Fall 2007), pp. 44–50
Christina Duff Stewart, (1975) The Taylors of Ongar: An Analytical Bio-Bibliography, New York & London: Garland Publishing
Ann Taylor, Isaac Taylor Jr, ed., (1832) Memoirs, Correspondence and Poetical Remains of Jane Taylor, The Writings of Jane Taylor, In Five Volumes, Vol. 1, Boston: Perkins & Marvin
Ann Taylor, Josiah Gilbert, ed., (1874) The Autobiography and Other Memorials of Mrs. Gilbert, Formerly Ann Taylor, London: Henry S. King & Co.

 Joaquin Arguello

External links

Little Ann and Other Poems From the Collections at the Library of Congress

1783 births
1824 deaths
English women poets
English women novelists
Children's poets
English children's writers
Writers from London
People from Lavenham
19th-century women writers
19th-century English women
19th-century English people